Lola Montes is a 1944 Spanish historical drama film directed by Antonio Román and starring Conchita Montenegro, Luis Prendes and Jesús Tordesillas. It portrays the life of the Irish dancer and courtesan Lola Montez.

Synopsis 
Ambitious Irish dancer Lola Montes rejects the love of Spanish Royal Guard captain Carlos Benjumea for success in Europe. In this way she ends up becoming the lover of the king of Bavaria and exciting the revolutionary spirits of the students of Munich, of which the intriguing Walter takes advantage for his sinister intentions.

Cast
 Conchita Montenegro as Lola Montes
 Luis Prendes as Carlos Benjumea  
 Jesús Tordesillas as Luis I de Baviera
 Mariano Alcón
 Joaquín Burgos 
 Antonio Calero as Pepe Montes  
 Ricardo Calvo  
 Manuel de Juan
 Julio Rey de las Heras 
 Miguel del Castillo 
 Ramón Elías 
 Félix Fernández 
 César Guzmán 
 Manuel Kayser
 Luis Latorre 
 Guillermo Marín as Walter  
 Carlos Muñoz 
 Nicolás D. Perchicot 
 José Portes 
 Manuel Requena 
 Santiago Rivero  
 Rosario Royo 
 Emilio Ruiz de Córdoba 
 José María Rupert
 Sergio Santos
 Pablo Álvarez Rubio

References

Bibliography
 Bentley, Bernard. A Companion to Spanish Cinema. Boydell & Brewer 2008.

External links 
 

1944 films
1940s historical drama films
Spanish historical drama films
1940s Spanish-language films
Films directed by Antonio Román
Films set in the 19th century
Films set in Munich
Cultural depictions of Lola Montez
Spanish black-and-white films
1944 drama films
1940s Spanish films